Eagles is a Swedish teen sports drama television series created by Stefan H. Lidén. Developed by New Stories, the first season premiered on Sveriges Television's streaming service SVT Play on 9 March 2019. The fourth and final season began airing on 28 January 2022.

Cast
 Alva Bratt as Felicia Kroon
 Edvard Olsson as Elias Kroon
 Adrian Öjvindsson as Ludvig Johansson
 Yandeh Sallah as Amie Samuelsson Condé
 Sarah Gustafsson as Klara Ceder
 Miryam Eriksson as Young Klara 
 Per Lasson as Mats Kroon
 Anton Forsdik as Young Mats
 Charlotta Jonsson as Leila Kroon
 Anna Sise as Petra Samuelsson
 Adja Sise as Young Petra 
 David Lindgren as Adam Molin
 Jakob Gartner as Omar Khalil
 Robert Pukitis as Ola Ceder
 Filip Wolfe Sjunnesson as Jack Barret
 Maria Alm Norell as Irene Johansson
 Oskar Laring as Andreas Johansson
 Måns Nilsson as Peter Johansson

Episodes

Series overview

Season 1 (2019)

Season 2 (2020)

Season 3 (2021)

Season 4 (2022)

Production
The series was created by Stefan H. Lidén for New Stories. Principal photography for the first season took place on location in Oskarshamn in 2018. Other filming locations included Karlskrona, Kalmar, Växjö, and Stockholm. The second season was filmed in autumn 2019.

Reception

Awards and nominations

References

External links
 

2010s Swedish television series
2010s teen drama television series
2019 Swedish television series debuts
2020s Swedish television series
2020s teen drama television series
2022 Swedish television series endings
Ice hockey television series
Sveriges Television original programming
Television series about teenagers